Sönke Rothenberger (born 14 October 1994) is a German Olympic equestrian. He represented his country at the 2016 Summer Olympics, where he finished in 19th place in the individual dressage competition.  He was also part of the German dressage team which won the gold medal in the team dressage competition.

Sönke is a son of dressage riders Sven and Gonnelien Rothenberger, multiple Olympic medalists from 1996 Summer Olympics. German-born Sven switched to the Netherlands after marrying Gonnelien. Meanwhile, Sönke, as well as his sisters Sanneke and Semmieke, have been representing Germany since the start of their international careers.

International Championship Results

Notable Horses

 Deinhard B - 1999 Palomino German Riding Pony Stallion (Dornick B x Golden Dancer)
 2007 European Pony Championships - Team Gold Medal, Individual Bronze Medal
 2008 European Pony Championships - Team Gold Medal, Individual Gold Medal
 2009 European Pony Championships - Team Gold Medal, Individual Silver Medal, Individual 15th Place Freestyle
 Cosmo 59 - 2007 Bay Dutch Warmblood Gelding (Van Gogh x Fruhling)
 2014 European Young Rider Championships - Team Gold Medal, Individual Bronze Medal, Individual Ninth Place Freestyle
 2016 Rio Olympics - Team Gold Medal, Individual 19th Place
 2017 European Championships - Team Gold Medal, Individual Silver Medal, Individual Silver Medal Freestyle
2018 World Equestrian Games - Team Gold Medal

References 

1994 births
Living people
German male equestrians
Equestrians at the 2016 Summer Olympics
Olympic equestrians of Germany
German dressage riders
Olympic gold medalists for Germany
Olympic medalists in equestrian
Medalists at the 2016 Summer Olympics
German people of Dutch descent